Melissa Jarrett is a fictional character from the Australian soap opera Neighbours, played by Jade Amenta. She made her first appearance on 8 August 1989. Melissa departed on 9 April 1991.

Casting
Amenta won the role of Melissa in a competition and she joined the cast of Neighbours at the age of fourteen. She said "I didn't think I'd get it, but I'm glad I did." Amenta took acting lessons and her coach entered her for the part. The role of Melissa was initially to last for two months and she was introduced as the girlfriend of Todd Landers (Kristian Schmid). Amenta was still at school while starring in the show and had to balance her work with filming.

Development
A writer for the show's official website branded Melissa a "pretty, cheeky, fun and forward" who was confident around other characters. They added "She was fairly popular but managed to hide her epilepsy from her friends well. She had lived in Erinsborough all her life, but not in Ramsay street." The character was part of the show's teenage character group which included herself, Cody Willis (Amelia Frid), Todd Landers (Kristian Schmid) and Josh Anderson (Jeremy Angerson). Melissa's first relationship is with Todd but her disapproving mother bans her from seeings Todd. She is unhappy that he and Gary "Boof" Head (Stephen Hall) were involved in a break-in at the local car crushing office. Their relationship was played out with a series of "ups and downs" over a one-year period. The four characters later became embroiled in a story which was labelled "TV's first love quadrangle". Cody was in relationship with Josh but producers decided that Melissa would romance Josh while Cody would take her place as Todd's love interest. The characters remain secretive about their feelings until the truth is revealed and the new relationships are formed. Frid told Caron Eastgate from TV Week that "it's funny to be swapping partners, but I think it's very cute."

One issue led storyline for the character was suffering from the medical condition epilepsy. She manages to keep her illness mostly concealed from other characters. She is responsible with the condition as she is careful about taking her medication. Anthony Hayward wrote in his book "The who's who of soap operas" that "because her fits are rare, she remains a confident, outgoing teenager."

Storylines
Melissa is first seen when she begins taking piano lessons with Hilary Robinson (Anne Scott-Pendlebury at Number 30 Ramsay Street. She is immediately smitten with Todd Landers, who lives two doors down from Hilary. Todd is shy at first but admits he likes Melissa and they begin dating. When Todd is caught in Melissa's room one night, her domineering parents, Ben and Rona ban the couple from seeing each other. Melissa and Todd date in secret, but Melissa's brother, Sean (Jamie Churchill), continuously plots to split Melissa and Todd up. Eventually the Jarretts relent when Todd's aunt Beverly Marshall (Shaunna O'Grady) and her husband Jim Robinson (Alan Dale) convince them that Todd is not a bad boy.

At the end of 1989, The Jarretts leave for America, putting a strain on Melissa and Todd's relationship. When the Jarretts return, Melissa finds out Todd had kissed classmate Cody while she was away and they break up. Melissa later dates the newly arrived Josh but he realises Melissa still loves Todd and the relationship fizzles out.  Soon after, Melissa sets Josh up with Cody but it does not last long when Cody discovers she still has feelings for Todd, and Melissa begins to like Josh the more time they spend together. In the end, Melissa and Josh become a couple as do Todd and Cody.

One afternoon, while being influenced by Todd's criminal friend Boof, the teens begin a drinking session which immediately proves dangerous for Melissa as she suffers from epilepsy, luckily Beverly is on hand to help. Melissa becomes close friends with animal rights activist Kerry Bishop (Linda Hartley-Clark) and is distraught when Kerry is shot and killed protesting against duck hunting. Melissa and Josh then concoct a scheme to expose Lassiter's for using frozen tuna and they sneak into the kitchens and head towards the fridge where they find the tuna but a kitchen hand shuts the door, leaving Josh and Melissa trapped. Josh quickly stops the fan from freezing them but Melissa is in danger due to suffering from epilepsy and not having her medication to hand. The couple are saved but Paul Robinson (Stefan Dennis) is unimpressed with the damaged fridge and demands payment for repairs.

When Melissa hears rumours of new teacher Mr Gibbs (Simon Woodward) having previously sexually assaulted a girl at his last school, she begins a crusade against him and immediately becomes paranoid that Gibbs is after her. In the end, Melissa is forced to apologise when Gibbs tells her his side of the story. When Todd, Josh and Cody accidentally causes an explosion in the science lab while trying to brew their own alcohol, Melissa, who is leaving for America with her family, takes the blame so she cannot be punished for it. However, her friends will not allow her to accept the blame and tell principal Dorothy Burke (Maggie Dence) that Melissa is innocent.

Reception
In 1991, Barbara Toner of The Sydney Morning Herald said Melissa had the "best entrance on the year's first episode of Neighbours." Toner also bemoaned the scripting of scenes in which Melissa has symptoms of a brain tumour.

During a feature called "Twelve golden TV sex moments", men's magazine, FHM declared 1991 was Neighbours''' finest hour. With Amenta as Melissa, Rachel Friend as Bronwyn Davies and Natalie Imbruglia as Beth Brennan, they said "Good God: that was when being unemployed or permanently bed-ridden really meant something". In 2020, Adam Beresford writing for HuffPost'' opined that Melissa, Todd, Cody and Josh formed one of the "show's best teen groups".

References

External links
 Character profile at Neighbours.com

Neighbours characters
Television characters introduced in 1989
Female characters in television
Fictional characters with epilepsy and seizures